"Born Late '58" is a single taken from Mott the Hoople's seventh and final studio album The Hoople.  It is the only Mott the Hoople track credited solely to, and sung by group bassist Peter Watts, prior to the group reforming as simply "Mott".  Just prior to the recording, de facto group leader Ian Hunter left the recording studio in frustration with the group's new guitarist Ariel Bender.  As a consequence, this is the only track in the seven albums credited to Mott the Hoople that Hunter had no direct involvement in.  Ironically (perhaps intentionally), the track features Bender's guitar as the most prominent instrument.

The song tells the story of a romantic encounter with girl (born in 1958, therefore 16 years old in 1974).

References

1974 singles
Mott the Hoople songs
1974 songs
CBS Records singles